Gerd is a common Germanic name. As a masculine name it is a shortened form of Gerhard and Gerardus. As a feminine name it may be a form of Gerda or Gertrud. See also Gert.

People with this name include:

Male 
 Gerd B. Achenbach (born 1947), German philosopher
 Gerd Achgelis (1908–1991), German aviator and test pilot
 Gerd Achterberg (born 1940), German football manager
 Gerd Albrecht (1935–2014), German conductor
 Gerd Andres (born 1951), German politician
 Gerd Aretz (1930–2009), German artist
 Gerd Arntz (1900–1988), German artist
 Gerd Audehm (born 1968), German former professional cyclist
 Gerd Bachmann (born 1943), German wrestler
 Gerd Backhaus (born 1942), German football player
 Gerd Baltus (1932–2019), German television actor
 Gerd Becker (chemist) (1940–2017), German chemist
 Gerd Becker (handballer) (born 1953), German handball player
 Gerd Binnig (born 1947), German physicist
 Gerd Böckmann (born 1944), German actor
 Gerd Boder (1933–1992), German composer
 Gerd Bohner (born 1959), professor of social psychology
 Gerd Bohnsack (born 1939), German football player and manager
 Gerd Bollmann (1947–2017), German politician
 Gerd Bonk (1951–2014), weightlifter
 Gerd Brenneis (1930–2003), German operatic tenor
 Gerd Briese (1897–1957), German actor
 Gerd vom Bruch (born 1941), German football player and coach
 Gerd Bucerius (1906–1995), German politician, publisher, and journalist
 Gerd Buchdahl (1914–2001)
 Gerd Buschhorn (1934–2010), German physicist
 Gerd Cintl (1938–2017), West German rower
 Gerd Dais (born 1963), German football player
 Gerd Domhardt (1945–1997), German composer
 Gerd Dörich (born 1968), German racing cyclist
 Gerd Dose (1942–2010), German literature and culture professor
 Gerd Dudek (born 1938), German jazz tenor saxophonist, soprano saxophonist, clarinetist, and flautist
 Gerd Dudenhöffer (born 1949), German cabaret artist
 Gerd Egger (born 1943), German judoka
 Gerd Faltings (born 1954), German mathematician
 Gerd Frähmcke (born 1950), German middle-distance runner
 Gerd Frick (born 1974), Italian mountain runner
 Gerd Frickhöffer (1913–1980), German actor
 Gerd Geerling (born 1965), German surgeon and professor
 Gerd Gies (born 1943), German politician
 Gerd Gigerenzer (born 1947), German psychologist
 Gerd F. Glang, NOAA Corps rear admiral
 Gerd Grabher (born 1953), Austrian football referee
 Gerd Gradwohl (born 1960), German paralympic alpine skier
 Gerd Greune (1949–2012), German politician
 Gerd Grochowski (1956–2017), German operatic bass-baritone
 Gerd Gruber (born 1982), Austrian ice hockey defenceman
 Gerd Hahn (born 1981), German economist and professor
 Gerd Hatje (1915–2007), German publisher
 Gerd Haxhiu (born 1972), Albanian football coach
 Gerd Heßler (born 1948), East German cross-country skier
 Gerd Heidemann (born 1931), German journalist
 Gerd Heinrich (1896–1984), German entomologist and ornithologist
 Gerd Heinz (born 1940), German actor and stage director
 Gerd Hennig (1935–2017), German football referee
 Gerd Heßler (born 1948), East German cross-country skier
 Gerd Heusch (born 1955), German physician, physiologist, and professor
 Gerd Hirzinger (born 1945), German roboticist
 Gerd Honsik (1941–2018), Austrian writer and lyric poet
 Gerd Hornberger (1910–1988), German sprinter
 Gerd Jendraschek, German linguist
 Gerd Jüttemann (born 1933), German psychologist
 Gerd Kanter (born 1979), Estonian discus thrower
 Gerd Kehrer (born 1939), German painter
 Gerd Kische (born 1951), German football player
 Gerd Kühr (born 1952), Austrian conductor and composer
 Gerd Leers (born 1951), Dutch politician
 Gerd E. Mäuser (born 1958), German businessman
 Gerd Michael Henneberg (1922–2011), German actor and theater director
 Gerd Mischke (1920–1992), German military commander
 Gerd Müller (1945–2021), German football player
 Gerd Müller (politician) (born 1955), German politician
 Gerd B. Müller (born 1953), Austrian theoretical biologist
 Gerd Nagel (born 1957), German high jumper
 Gerd Oswald (1919–1989), American film director
 Gerd R. Puin (born 1940), German orientalist
 Gerd Riss (born 1965), German speedway rider
 Gerd Roggensack (born 1941), German football player and manager
 Gerd Ruge (born 1928), German journalist, author and filmmaker
 Gerd Ruge (soldier) (1913–1997), German military commander
 Gerd von Rundstedt (1875–1953), German World War II field marshal
 Gerd Saborowski (born 1943), German football player
 Gerd Schädlich (born 1952), German footballer
 Gerd Schönfelder (born 1970), German para-alpine skier
 Gerd Schwidrowski (born 1947), German footballer
 Gerd Siegmund (born 1973), German ski jumper
 Gerd Springer (1927–1999), Austrian footballer and coach
 Gerd Tacke (1906–1997), German businessman
 Gerd Theissen (born 1943), German theologian
 Gerd Türk, German tenor
 Gerd Völs (1909–1991), German rower
 Gerd Wessig (born 1959), East German high jumper
 Gerd Zimmermann (footballer) (born 1949), German football player
 Gerd Zimmermann (speed skater) (born 1942), German speed skater

Female 
 Gerd Andersson (born 1932), Swedish actress
 Gerd Barkman, shooting competitor for New Zealand
 Gerd Benneche (1913–2003), Norwegian jurist, journalist, non-fiction writer, and politician
 Gerd Kjellaug Berge (born 1943), Norwegian hotelier
 Gerd Brantenberg (born 1941), Norwegian author, teacher, and feminist writer
 Gerd Dvergsdal (born 1946), Norwegian politician
 Gerd Fleischer (born 1942), Norwegian human rights activist
 Gerd Grieg (1895–1988), Norwegian actress
 Gerd Grønvold Saue (born 1930), Norwegian journalist, literary critic, novelist, hymnwriter, and peace activist
 Gerd Grubb (born 1939), Danish mathematician
 Gerd Gudding (1951–2015), Norwegian musician
 Gerd Hagman (1919–2011), Swedish actress
 Gerd Hegnell (born 1935), Swedish actress
 Irma Gerd (born 1989), Canadian drag queen
 Gerd Janne Kristoffersen (born 1952), Norwegian politician
 Gerd Larsen (1921–2001), Norwegian-British ballerina
 Gerd Neggo (1891–1974), Estonian dancer and choreographer
 Gerd Søraa (1934–2018), Norwegian writer and politician

German masculine given names
Norwegian feminine given names